Marko Zalaznik (born 7 October 1994) is a Slovenian football midfielder.

References

External links
PrvaLiga profile 
UEFA profile

1994 births
Living people
Slovenian footballers
Association football midfielders
Association football forwards
NK Olimpija Ljubljana (2005) players
Slovenia youth international footballers
Slovenian PrvaLiga players